Zulia River is a river in Venezuela and Colombia.  It is a tributary of the Catatumbo River. The Zulia forms a small part of the international boundary between the two countries. 

Zulia is a state in northwestern of Venezuela surrounded by the border of gulf of Venezuela and west of Colombia. Zulia is one of the 23 state of Venezuela. The State capital is Maracaibo.

References

External links

Rivers of Colombia
Rivers of Venezuela
Maracaibo basin
Colombia–Venezuela border
International rivers of South America
Border rivers